Hueyapan de Ocampo is a Mexican municipality Veracruz. It is located in south of the state, about 245 km from state capital Xalapa. The municipality has an area of 824.18 km.

The municipality of Hueyapan de Ocampo is delimited to the north by San Andrés Tuxtla and Catemaco, to the south by Santiago Tuxtla, Acayucan and Juan Rodríguez Clara, to the east by Soteapan and to the west by Isla.

References

External links 
 Hueyapan de Ocampo Tourist Guide
  Municipal Official webpage
  Municipal Official Information

Municipalities of Veracruz
Los Tuxtlas